Shane Richardson is an American football coach and former player. He served as the head football coach at the University of North Carolina at Pembroke from 2014 to 2022. He was hired as  head coach of the Braves on February 21, 2014. His contract was not renewed following the 2022 season.

Head coaching record

Notes

References

External links
 UNC Pembroke profile

Year of birth missing (living people)
Living people
American football linebackers
Jamestown Jimmies football coaches
North Dakota State Bison football coaches
Northern Michigan Wildcats football coaches
Northern Michigan Wildcats football players
UNC Pembroke Braves football coaches